Urakkam Varaatha Raathrikal is a 1978 Indian Malayalam film,  directed by M. Krishnan Nair and produced by M. Mani. The film stars Madhu, KPAC Lalitha, Jose and Jose Prakash in the lead roles. The film has musical score by Shyam.

Cast
Madhu as Jayan
KPAC Lalitha
Jose as Venu
Jose Prakash
Manavalan Joseph
Kunchan
Reena as Malathy
Seema as Kavitha

Soundtrack
The music was composed by Shyam and the lyrics were written by Bichu Thirumala.

References

External links
 

1978 films
1970s Malayalam-language films
Films directed by M. Krishnan Nair